Alfonso "Al" Smith, Jr. is a retired American soccer defender.

Smith grew up in Ellenwood, Georgia where he was a Parade All American soccer player at Cedar Grove High School.  He played one game for the United States U-20 men's national soccer team at the 1981 FIFA World Youth Championship.  In July 1984, Smith was named to U.S. soccer team at the 1984 Summer Olympics.  However, he and several other collegiate players were replaced by professionals before the tournament.  On June 19, 1985, the Wichita Wings selected Smith in the first round (fourth overall) of the Major Indoor Soccer League draft.

External links
 MISL stats
 

Living people
1962 births
American soccer players
Major Indoor Soccer League (1978–1992) players
Parade High School All-Americans (boys' soccer)
Soccer players from Atlanta
Wichita Wings (MISL) players
United States men's under-20 international soccer players
Association football defenders